Dagg Day Afternoon is a 1977 New Zealand  comedy starring John Clarke. It was written and directed by John Clarke and Geoff Murphy.

Synopsis
Fred Dagg's secret mission to find a "bionic sheep" (or 6 million dollar ram) which has been lost by the government is shown in a series of sketches.

Cast

Reviews
1977 The Press Wild man attacks TV viewers.

References

External links 
 

New Zealand action comedy films
1970s New Zealand films
1977 films
Films directed by Geoff Murphy
Films shot in New Zealand
1970s action comedy films
Films set in New Zealand
1977 comedy films
1970s English-language films